SD Željezničar is the second largest association of sport clubs with the same name in Bosnia and Herzegovina. The largest one is USD Bosna. It was founded in 1921 by a group of railway workers as RŠD (Radničko športsko društvo, eng. Workers' sports society) Željezničar, but after the World War II initial acronym was changed to SD.

Football

When it was founded in 1921 its first member was football club FK Željezničar. FK Željezničar is also the most prominent and most popular member of this association. They have managed to win one championship title in former Yugoslavia in 1972, and six more titles in the independent Bosnia and Herzegovina (1998, 2001, 2002, 2010, 2012, 2013). Six more Bosnian cup titles were added. The club's biggest international result was recorded in 1985 when they have reached the UEFA Cup semi-final.

SD Željezničar does not yet have a women's football club as there is no big demand for it. Not to be confused with ŽNK Željezničar 2011 from Bosanska Krupa. Local rival clubs women's club side and traditional powerhouse in the country is SFK 2000.

Handball

Rukometni klub (eng. Handball club) Željezničar was the most successful Bosnian handball club in former Yugoslavia, alongside RK Borac Banja Luka. They have won the championship title in 1978. and reached the final of EHF Cup in 1982 integrating also foreigners and French players such as Herman Müller and Sylvain Annonier, where they have lost to Gummersbach. In independent Bosnia, they managed to win the war championship in 1993, but never actually established themselves as a title winning team. They were close to the top, but with no championship or cup titles (losing finalists). Club played in competitions organized by EHF on several occasions. However, club was relegated due to financial problems. After a couple of seasons, in 2006, they have been promoted to the top flight, but for one season only, since then they have been relegated again.

Women's handball club had more success in Bosnian era. They won three cup titles in 1996, 1999. and 2002, but not yet won a championship. Club's headquarters are in Hadžići, small town near Sarajevo. They play their home matches there and they are also a regular participant in European club competitions.

Basketball

Basketball is the second most popular sport in Bosnia and Herzegovina. Košarkaški klub (eng. Basketball club) Željezničar for men no longer exists. It was one of the best Bosnian clubs in the 1960s and 1970s, but in the 1980s it ceased to exist. In the overall Yugoslav championship table 1946-1991, they occupied 24th place. They spent six seasons in top flight.

On the other side, the women's club won the Yugoslav championship (in which they were regular participants) in 1971. They also managed to reach the Yugoslav Basketball Cup final in 1988 and 1989. However, their best results came in independent Bosnia and Herzegovina. They won the Bosnian championship title 9 times, Bosnian cup 8 times and WABA League in 2003.

 Champions of Yugoslavia (1) - 1971.
 Champions of Bosnia and Herzegovina (11) - 1998, 1999, 2002, 2003, 2004, 2005, 2006, 2007, 2008, 2009, 2010.
 Cup of Bosnia-Herzegovina winners (9) - 1998, 1999, 2003, 2004, 2005, 2006, 2007, 2008, 2010.
 WABA League (1) - 2003.
National League Winners (12):- 1971, 1998, 1999, 2002, 2003, 2004, 2005, 2006, 2007, 2008, 2009, 2010.
There were three separated league and cup competitions in Bosnia and Herzegovina before the 2002/2003 season and, before that season, only several joint play-offs were played to determine one final champion or cup winner. KK Željezničar also won four championship and four cup titles in one of those regions.
 Regional champions (4) - 1998, 1999, 2000, 2001.
 Regional Cup winners (4) - 1998, 1999, 2000, 2001.

Other sports
Other clubs, members of SD Željezničar are:

Šahovski klub (Chess club), ”ŠK “Željezničar” Sarajevo, traditionally one of the best in the country;
Skijaški klub (Skiing club), the best in the country;
Klub dizača tegova (Weightlifting club), one of the best in the country;
Kuglaški klub (Bowling club), one of the best in the country;
Odbojkaški klub (Volleyball club)
Stonoteniski klub (Table tennis club);
Judo klub (Judo club);
Streljački klub (Shooting sports club);
Planinarsko društvo (Mountaineering society);

Before the war, there were more of them, but it is possible they will be reestablished again. These are the clubs, beside men's basketball and women's football, which no longer exist:

 Atletski klub (Track and field club);
 Auto-moto klub (Auto racing club);
 Bokserski klub (Boxing club);
 Bob i sankaški klub (Bobsleigh and Luge club);
 Hrvački klub (Wrestling club);

Supporters

SD Željezničar has a great number of supporters in Bosnia and Herzegovina. Most of them are concentrated on football, but other members of SD Željezničar have their fans. The most passionate fans are called The Maniacs and they are excellent in creating good atmosphere, outdoors and indoors. Since football is the most popular sport in country, FK Željezničar have the biggest army of supporters. Handball and basketball are the most popular indoor sports.

An interesting story is associated with basketball. Since there is no men's basketball club Željezničar anymore, and people really love that sport, two usually opposite groups of football fans - The Maniacs and Horde Zla (whose SD Sarajevo also does not have a basketball club), can be found together cheering for KK Bosna Royal.

External links
Official Website of Football club
Official Website of Basketball club
Website of Željezničar's supporters

Sports teams in Bosnia and Herzegovina
Multi-sport clubs in Bosnia and Herzegovina
Sport in Sarajevo

el:Ζελέσνιταρ Σαράγεβο